Topper Corporation was a United States toy and board game manufacturer based in Elizabeth, New Jersey. The company, founded and run by Henry Orenstein, a holocaust survivor, produced toys under several brand names including: Johnny Lightning (scale model cars, released in 1969), Johnny Seven OMA (toy weapon), Dawn doll, and Suzy Homemaker.

Products manufactured and commercialised by Deluxe Reading included scale model cars, toy weapons, dolls, toy robots, board games, action figures, among others. After a failed attempt to take the company public, Topper Toys closed in 1971 and went into bankruptcy in 1973.

Overview 

The company was originally established by Henry Orenstein as "Deluxe Toy Creations" in 1951. In late 1950s, Orenstein sold the company for $2 million (although he continued in charge of the business), and the name was changed to "Deluxe Reading Toys". Orenstein would buy back the company in 1966 for $49 million, also bringing back the "Deluxe Topper Toys" name.

For boys, the Johnny Lightning (launched in 1969) and Johnny Seven O.M.A toys were the most popular; for girls, the Dawn Doll. Deluxe Reading dolls were sold in the 1950s–1970s through supermarkets and are often referred to as Grocery Store Dolls. They were an inexpensive alternative to department store dolls, although of similar quality. Another successful toy for girls was the "Dream Kitchen" (circa 1961) which consisted of four 12-inch-tall colorful kitchen appliances, a kitchen table and four chairs. This toy was unique in that the sink worked with water, the oven contained batteries which revolved a plastic turkey on a spit inside the oven, the refrigerator had pull-out shelves, and the dishwasher also worked with water. 

Also included were scores of food boxes, cleaning supplies, food replica items, plates, utensils and more. The box proclaimed that it held "176 pieces." The size of the set perfectly matched the size of Barbie, a toy doll which was wildly popular at that time. As of 2014, this kitchen toy set can be seen on sale (used) for up to $400.

They were also the first company to manufacture Sesame Street dolls officially licensed by Children's Television Workshop and Henson Associates, until the company's financial problems caused CTW and Henson to terminate the contract in January 1973.

The toys were packaged in large, colorful boxes that could be easily seen atop grocery store shelves. The top shelf is typically unusable for typical grocery items and this sales gimmick was used by Deluxe Reading as a selling point to retail store owners. The large, electrically operated Crusader 101 toy car is an example of the marketing concept.

The Topper Toys trademark and assets were liquidated in the late 1970s, with the marks and toy molds purchased by Jay Horowitz of American Plastic Equipment, who later transferred all rights to American Plastic Equipment's subsidiary, American Classic Toys.

Notable toys

Board games 
 Charley n' Me 
 Fat Sam 
 Fingers Harry 
 Silly Safari

Dolls 

 Baby Magic (doll)
 Candy Fashion (doll)
 Dawn Doll 
 The Go-Go's
 Lil Miss Fussy 
 Lillie Doll
 Penny Brite Doll (1963)
 Sesame Street (1970–73) 
 Suzy Cute Doll (Topper Toys 1964)

Vehicles 

 Battlewagon (ship)
 Crusader 101 (car)
 Johnny Express (truck)
 Johnny Lightning (cars)
 Johnny Speed (construction kit)
 Johnny Toymaker (various)
 Tiger Joe (tank)

Toys 

 The Chief (firetruck and figures)
 Clock-A-Word 
 Defender Dan (machine gun)
 Ding-A-Ling (toy robot)
 Dream Kitchen (c. 1961)
 Funny Face 
 Jimmy Jet military aircraft)
 Johnny Astro
 Johnny Eagle (pistol)
 Johnny Seven OMA (rifle, 1964)
 Johnny Spacemobile X-7 
 Johnny Service (repair shop) 
 Jimmy Jet (aircraft, 1961)
 Motorized Monster Maker (kit)
 Mr Pierre 
 Multi-Pistol 09 (1965)
 Operation X-500 (rocket launcher with base, 1960)
 Playmobile Dashboard (1961)
 The Tigers (military action figures, 1966)
 Secret Sam (spy kit) 
 Sixfinger (plastic finger)
 Super Helmet (1966)
 Suzy Homemaker Oven 

Notes

References

Toy companies of the United States
Defunct toy manufacturers
Defunct companies based in New Jersey
Companies based in Essex County, New Jersey